Aleksandr Vasiliyevich Medved  (born 16 September 1937) is a Ukrainian-born Soviet Belarusian retired freestyle wrestler who competed for the Soviet Union and was named "one of the greatest wrestlers in history" by FILA, the sport's governing body. Between 1962 and 1972 he won three Olympic gold medals, seven world and three European titles. He served as the Olympic flag bearer for the Soviet Union in 1972, for Belarus in 2004 and recited the Judge's Oath at the Opening Ceremony of the 1980 Olympics.

Biography 
According to Medved, his grandparents came from Russia; his grandmother was ca. 195 cm, and his grandfather was even taller. Medved was smaller, at 190 cm and 100+ kg, yet big enough to fit into his last name, which means bear in Russian (and with minor variations in Belarusian and Ukrainian languages).

Between 1967 and 1972 Medved had a rivalry with Turkish-Bulgarian wrestler Osman Duraliev. They met eight times in the finals of major international championships and Medved won on all occasions. He was close to losing at the 1971 World Championships in Sofia, where Duraliev led the match 4:3 with 43 seconds left. Yet Medved equalized the score and won the title because of his lower body weight.

After retiring from competitions in 1972 Medved moved to Belarus, where he served with the Soviet Army in the late 1950s. There he worked as a national coach and lectured at the Belarusian State University of Informatics and Radioelectronics. After the breakup of the Soviet Union he was appointed as vice-president of the Belarus Olympic Committee and of the Belarus Wrestling Federation. Previously he was awarded the Order of Lenin (1964), Order of the Red Banner of Labour (1970) and Order of the Badge of Honour (1964, 1969, 1985). In 2001 he was chosen as the best Belorussian athlete of the 20th century and in 2003 became one of the first 10 inductees to the FILA International Wrestling Hall of Fame. He is an honored citizen of Minsk, where since 1970s an annual wrestling tournament is held in his honor.

Medved is married to Tatyana, they have a daughter Elena and son Aleksei. Elena was a Belarusian tennis champion, while Aleksei won a junior world title in wrestling in 1987.

References

External links

Biography. Belarusian Olympic Committee

1937 births
Living people
People from Bila Tserkva
Belarusian male sport wrestlers
Olympic wrestlers of the Soviet Union
Wrestlers at the 1964 Summer Olympics
Wrestlers at the 1968 Summer Olympics
Wrestlers at the 1972 Summer Olympics
Soviet male sport wrestlers
Olympic gold medalists for the Soviet Union
Burevestnik (sports society) athletes
Olympic medalists in wrestling
Recipients of the Olympic Order
Olympic officials
World Wrestling Championships medalists
Medalists at the 1972 Summer Olympics
Medalists at the 1968 Summer Olympics
Medalists at the 1964 Summer Olympics
Oath takers at the Olympic Games
European Wrestling Championships medalists
World Wrestling Champions